Skarino Gerald Rashard Everett (born June 25, 1994) is an American football tight end for the Los Angeles Chargers of the National Football League (NFL). He played college football at South Alabama, and was drafted by the Los Angeles Rams in the second round of the 2017 NFL Draft.

Early years
Everett was born in Atlanta, Georgia, to Alicia Wise. He attended Columbia High School in Decatur, Georgia. He played three seasons of high school basketball and ran track for the Eagles and did not play football for the Eagles until his senior year.

College career
Everett attended Hutchinson Community College in 2012 and 2013 and the University of Alabama at Birmingham (UAB) in 2014. After the UAB football program was shut down, he transferred to the University of South Alabama in 2015 where he played for  coach Joey Jones's South Alabama Jaguars football team from  2015 to 2016. In his two years at South Alabama, he had 41 receptions for 575 yards and eight touchdowns and earned first-team All-Sun Belt notice as a junior and 49 receptions for 717 yards and four touchdowns as a senior. Everett received an invitation to the Senior Bowl.

Collegiate statistics

Professional career
Everett received an invitation to the Senior Bowl. He helped the South defeat the North 16–15 and made one catch for six yards. Unfortunately, he tied Donnel Pumphrey, who stands at 5'8", for the smallest hand of any pass catcher at the Senior Bowl. He attended the NFL Combine and completed all of the  required combine drills. Everett also attended South Alabama's Pro Day and opted to re-try the short shuttle and broad jump, but was unable to beat his combine numbers in both categories. NFL draft experts and analysts projected him to be a second or third round pick in the draft. He was ranked the fourth-best tight end in the draft by ESPN and NFL media analyst Mike Mayock, the fifth-best tight end by NFLDraftScout.com, and was ranked the sixth-best tight end in the draft by Sports Illustrated.

Los Angeles Rams
Everett was drafted in the second round with the 44th overall pick by the Los Angeles Rams, in the 2017 NFL Draft. He was the fourth tight end selected in the draft and first player ever to be drafted from South Alabama.

2017 season
On June 13, 2017, the Rams signed Everett to a four-year, $6.04 million contract that includes $3.27 million guaranteed and a signing bonus of $2.53 million.

Everett made his NFL debut in the Rams' season-opener against the Indianapolis Colts and caught his first NFL reception on a 39-yard pass from quarterback Jared Goff during a 46–9 victory. The following game, he caught a season-high three receptions for 95 yards in the Rams' 27–20 loss to the Washington Redskins. On October 15, 2017, Everett recorded his first NFL touchdown on a four-yard reception from Goff in a 27–17 road victory against the Jacksonville Jaguars.

Everett finished his rookie year with 16 receptions for 244 yards and two touchdowns. He made his playoff debut in the Wild Card Round against the Atlanta Falcons. He had a four-yard reception in the 26–13 loss.

2018 season
Everett was a significant contributor in the Rams' narrow 54–51 victory over the Kansas City Chiefs on Monday Night Football in Week 11, catching two touchdowns in the fourth quarter. In the 2018 season, Everett finished with 33 receptions for 320 yards and three touchdowns.

In the NFC Championship, he had two receptions for 50 yards in the 26–23 overtime victory over the New Orleans Saints. Everett was targeted once in Super Bowl LIII but had no receptions in the 13–3 loss to the New England Patriots.

2019 season
During Week 5 on Thursday Night Football against the Seattle Seahawks, Everett finished with 136 receiving yards, marking his first 100-plus yard game in his NFL career, but the Rams narrowly lost by a score of 29–30. Overall, he appeared in 13 games in the 2019 season and recorded 37 receptions for 408 receiving yards and two receiving touchdowns.

2020 season
In Week 4 of the 2020 season, Everett recorded his first career rushing touchdown in the 17–9 victory over the New York Giants. In the 2020 season, Everett appeared in 16 games and recorded 41 receptions for 417 receiving yards and one receiving touchdown.

Seattle Seahawks
On March 21, 2021, Everett signed a one-year contract with the Seattle Seahawks. He played in 15 games with 12 starts, recording a career-high 48 catches for 478 yards and four touchdowns.

Los Angeles Chargers
On March 22, 2022, Everett signed a two-year, $12 million contract with the Los Angeles Chargers.

NFL career statistics

Regular season

Postseason

References

External links

  Los Angeles Chargers bio
 South Alabama Jaguars bio
 UAB Blazers bio
 Gerald Everett on Twitter

1994 births
Living people
African-American players of American football
American football tight ends
Hutchinson Blue Dragons football players
People from Lithonia, Georgia
Seattle Seahawks players
Players of American football from Georgia (U.S. state)
South Alabama Jaguars football players
Sportspeople from DeKalb County, Georgia
UAB Blazers football players
21st-century African-American sportspeople
Los Angeles Chargers players